Grime Wave is the fourth album by English grime artist Wiley. The album was released on 26 May 2008 by Eskibeat Recordings.

Critical reception

Track listing

References 

2008 albums
Wiley (musician) albums